Thora Grahl-Nielsen (29 June 1901 – 19 April 1976) was a Norwegian politician for the Conservative Party.

She served as a deputy representative to the Parliament of Norway from Bergen during the terms 1950–1953, 1954–1957 and 1958–1961. In total she met during 39 days of parliamentary session.

References

1901 births
1976 deaths
Deputy members of the Storting
Conservative Party (Norway) politicians
Politicians from Bergen
Women members of the Storting
Place of birth missing
20th-century Norwegian women politicians
20th-century Norwegian politicians